Winnipeg lies at the bottom of the Red River Valley, a low-lying flood plain with an extremely flat topography. This valley was formed by the ancient glacial Lake Agassiz which has rich deposits of black soil. Winnipeg is on the eastern edge of the Canadian Prairies in Western Canada; it is known as the 'Gateway to the West'. It is relatively close to many large Canadian Shield lakes and parks, as well as Lake Winnipeg (the Earth's twelfth largest freshwater lake). Winnipeg is bordered by tallgrass prairie to the west and south and the aspen parkland to the northeast.

The city has a humid continental climate with wide temperature contrasts between winter and summer, and greater precipitation in summer.

Winnipeg has three major rivers: the Red River, the Assiniboine River, and the Seine River. The Red River is a Canadian heritage river. Because of Winnipeg's extremely flat topography and substantial snowfall, Winnipeg is subject to severe flooding. The Red River reached its greatest flood height in 1826. The Red River Floodway protects the city from flooding.

Cityscape

According to the 2001 Census, there are 230 neighbourhoods in Winnipeg.
Downtown Winnipeg, the city's economic core, is centred on the intersection of Portage Avenue and Main Street (reputed to be one of the windiest in Canada). Downtown Winnipeg covers an area of about one square mile (2.5 km2) and is the fastest growing high-income neighbourhood in the city. More than 72,000 people work downtown, and over 40,000 students attend classes at its universities and colleges. The past few decades have seen downtown undergo major revitalization efforts; since 1999, over Can$1.2 billion has been invested.

The tallest building in the city is the newer 33-storey,  201 Portage.

Downtown Winnipeg's Exchange District is named after the area's original grain exchange from 1880 to 1913. The 30-block district received National Historic Site of Canada status in 1997; it includes North America's most extensive collection of early 20th-century terracotta and cut stone architecture, 62 of downtown Winnipeg's 86 heritage structures, Stephen Juba Park, and Old Market Square, home to Winnipeg Jazz and Fringe Festivals. Other major downtown areas include The Forks, Central Park, Broadway-Assiniboine and Chinatown. Many of Downtown Winnipeg's major buildings are linked with the Winnipeg Walkway skywalk.

Various residential neighbourhoods surround downtown in all directions, but expansion is greatest to the south and west, and has tended to follow the course of the two major rivers. The largest park in the city, Assiniboine Park next to the affluent neighbourhood of Tuxedo, houses the Assiniboine Park Zoo and the Leo Mol Sculpture Garden, Other large city parks include Kildonan Park, St. Vital Park, and Fort Whyte Centre. The major commercial areas in the city are Polo Park (West End and St. James), Kildonan Crossing (Transcona and East Kildonan), South St. Vital, Garden City (West Kildonan) and the Corydon strip.

Osborne Village is Winnipeg's most densely populated neighbourhood, as well as the second most densely populated neighbourhood in Western Canada. It was voted the Best Place to Live in Uptown Magazine's 2008 Best of List. Osborne Village is a complex urban community with a rich heritage and diverse built forms. It's appreciated as a desirable location in which to live, work, and play. As such, it continues to experience development interest. Popular annual events include the Canada Day Festival. Osborne Village is home to one of Winnipeg's most vibrant collection of stores and restaurants with over 175 businesses calling Osborne Village home.

Little Italy is a vibrant Italian district. Located on Corydon Avenue, between Stafford Street in the west, and Pembina Highway in the east it is home to many boutiques and some of the city's finest restaurants and Gelato.

Saint Boniface is the centre of much of the Franco-Manitoban community. It features such landmarks as the Cathédrale de Saint Boniface (St. Boniface Cathedral), Boulevard Provencher, the Provencher Bridge, Esplanade Riel, St. Boniface Hospital, the Collège universitaire de Saint-Boniface and the Royal Canadian Mint. It covers the southeast part of the city and has a population of 65,000.

Roadways and addresses

The city uses the grid plan but there are several different grids in place, as the city was originally thirteen separate municipalities and each developed under different circumstances and under different rules. Although it is common for roadways running north–south to be called "streets" and those running east–west to be called "avenues", the practice is far from universal, and few roadways run in a precise cardinal direction; an "east-west" road may run at a 45-degree angle from true east–west. Attempts in the early 20th century to bring order to the system by giving numerical names to the streets failed; all roadways in the city have proper names, some of which are repeated. (There is, for instance, a Wellington Crescent in River Heights and a Wellington Avenue in the West End, and a Killarney Avenue in Fort Garry and a Killarney Street in St. Vital.)

There is also no universal address numbering system in place. Address numbers usually increase as the distance from either the Red or Assiniboine rivers increases, but this is by no means uniform, even within a specific district. These peculiarities can cause serious problems for newcomers and visitors, especially in the older areas of the city, and may even affect postal and other deliveries.

Many of the main thoroughfares in Winnipeg are wide due to the spring soil conditions and the historical use of the Red River ox cart which created wide ruts in the (then) muddy roads. Portage Avenue has four lanes of traffic in each direction plus a central boulevard for much of its run through Winnipeg. Few thoroughfares, however, are as wide as the freeways seen in other Canadian cities (such as the 401 in Toronto or Deerfoot Trail in Calgary). Residential streets are commonly significantly narrower than streets in other Western Canadian cities, so narrow that parking is only possible on one side of the street.

Climate
Winnipeg lies in the middle of the North American continent on a low-lying, flat plain. Due to its location in the Canadian Prairies, and its distance from both mountains and oceans, it has an extreme humid continental climate (Köppen Dfb, Plant Hardiness Zone 3b-4a), in that there are great differences between summer and winter temperatures. The openness of the prairies leaves Winnipeg exposed to numerous weather systems including blizzards and cold Arctic high pressure systems, known as the polar high. Winnipeg has four distinct seasons, with short transitional periods between winter and summer.

The city averages  of precipitation per year, although this can vary greatly from year to year.

Climate data is also available for downtown Winnipeg, with a weather station located at The Forks.  This data demonstrates the urban heat island effect cities have on moderating temperatures compared to airport weather stations.

Winter

Typical winter phenomena include the bonspiel (January) thaw, ice fog, and the aurora borealis. The city is virtually assured of having a white Christmas as there is only one 25 December on record in the last century where there was no snow on the ground. From December through February the maximum daily temperature exceeds , on average, for only 10 days and the minimum daily temperature falls below  on 49 days.

Summer

Summers are typically warm and generally not overly humid, with average humidity levels around 50% from June to August. Occasionally, humidex readings exceed 40. The trees will usually be in full bloom by late May and do not lose their leaves until early October. Winnipeg's growing season lasts from 25 May to 22 September; and temperatures frequently hover in the mid to high twenties Celsius (77F to 86F). The city frequently gets thunderstorms during the summer, averaging 27 per season. The city can occasionally have short blasts of hot weather like on 23 August 2011 the temperature reached . The temperature reaches at or above  14 times a year, which is ranked the 16th highest in Canada, just above Toronto, Ontario. The highest humidex reading was 48 on 25 July 2007.

Spring and autumn

The weather during these seasons is highly variable, and rapidly changing. The city often receives an Indian summer, when summer weather returns briefly after the first frosts, usually in late September or sometimes October. Some Septembers can have gorgeous weather, like in September 2009 Winnipeg only saw 4 days with daytime highs below 20 °C (68 °F) at the Forks weather station.

Sunshine
Winnipeg is one of Canada's sunniest cities, and the weather in all seasons is characterized by an abundance of sunshine. In July and August combined, Winnipeg has 60 out of 62 days with measurable sunshine; and has an annual average of 306 days a year with measurable sunshine. November is the least sunny month while July and August are the most sunny months. Winnipeg is ranked second for Canada's clearest skies year-round, sixth sunniest city year-round, and second for sunniest city in Canada in spring and winter. Winnipeg is sunnier in the summer, spring, and winter than any Canadian city east of it. Winnipeg has short daylight hours in the winter and long daylight hours in the summer. On the shortest day of the year (21 December) Winnipeg only has 8 hours and 5 minutes of daylight with the sun setting at 4:29pm and doesn't rise until 8:24am. On 21 June (the longest day of the year) Winnipeg has 16 hours and 21 minutes of daylight with twilight ending at 10:25pm and twilight starting at 4:35am.

Precipitation
There is measurable rainfall on 76.9 days throughout the year, and 54.7 days with snowfall. Most of the precipitation occurs in the warmer months, with June being the wettest month and February being the driest. Droughts can take place in the region, however they do not happen as frequently as cities further west like Calgary or Swift Current. During the winter Winnipeg will get precipitation mostly in the form of snow, with 36 days of snow falling from December to February. Even in the winter there is occasional rainfall with 2.5 days on average of rainfall during December to February. Other forms of winter precipitation include ice, sleet, and freezing rain. Snow cover usually lasts from November till March, about 132 days or 36% of the year;. The city frequently gets thunderstorms during the summer, averaging 27 days a year with thunderstorms.

Wind
Winnipeg has a reputation for being a windy city with the intersection of Portage and Main being called the windiest intersection in Canada; however, Winnipeg is only the 12th windiest city in Canada, just below Hamilton, Ontario. April is the windiest month, and July the least windy. Tornadoes do occur in the area, particularly in the spring and summer months, however they are not frequent.

Flooding

Because of its flat topography and substantial snowfall, Winnipeg is subject to severe flooding. The Red River reached its greatest flood height in 1826, and this event still remains the highest flood stage of the last two hundred years.

A major flood in 1950 caused a State of Emergency to be declared and the Canadian Army was brought in to protect residents and property. Because of the flood, 100,000 residents were evacuated from their homes and approximately 10,000 homes were destroyed, along with many hospitals, schools and businesses. The flood prompted the Government of Manitoba, under former Premier Dufferin Roblin, to build the Red River Floodway.

Construction on the floodway project began 6 October 1962 and cost $63 million. The project resulted in excavation of approximately 76.5 million cubic metres of earth. Completed in March 1968, it has successfully prevented over $10 billion in flood damages. The flood control system prevented flooding in 1974 and 1979 when water levels neared record levels. However, in the 1997 Red River flood, water threatened the city's relatively unprotected southwest corner. Flood control dikes were reinforced and raised using sandbags and the threat was averted. Winnipeg suffered limited damage compared to cities without flood control structures, such as Grand Forks, North Dakota.

Other related water diversion projects farther away from Winnipeg include the Portage Diversion (also known as the Assiniboine River Floodway) and the Shellmouth Reservoir.

Flora and fauna

Winnipeg is situated where tall grass prairie meets aspen parkland and is not very far from boreal coniferous forests of the rocky Canadian Shield. The tall grass prairie areas are notable for its endangered western prairie fringed orchid. Some prairie grasses include big bluestem and spear grasses; and wildflowers include aster, goldenrod, prairie crocus and lady's-slipper. Some birds found around Winnipeg include ferruginous and Swainson's hawks; screech and great horned owls; as well as Canada geese and mallards. Winnipeg is also home of the largest remaining mature urban elm forest in North America. Some species of Winnipeg's 8 million trees include elm, ash, maple, oak, poplar, basswood, willow, birch, spruce, pine, cedar, as well as some fruit trees and shrubs. The Red River is the home of a number of species of fish including catfish, goldeye, and walleye.

Notes

References 

Winnipeg